Sunny is a 1984 Indian film directed by Raj Khosla. The movie stars Dharmendra, Waheeda Rehman, Sharmila Tagore, Sunny Deol, Amrita Singh in lead roles. Dharmendra played the father of his real-life son Sunny Deol in the film, but they do not appear onscreen together. They went on to appear onscreen together in films like Sultanat (1986) and Kshatriya (1993). The movie had two notable songs, namely "Aur Kya Ahade Wafa Hote Hain" and "Jane Kya Baat Hai", penned by Anand Bakshi and composed by R. D. Burman.

Cast 
 Dharmendra as Inderjeet
 Waheeda Rehman as Gayatri 
 Sharmila Tagore as Sitara
 Sunny Deol as Sunny 
 Amrita Singh as Amrita

Plot 
Wealthy businessman Inderjeet marries a lovely woman named Gayetri, but is unhappy with this marriage, as she is unable to bear him any children. He starts frequenting brothels, where he meets with an attractive prostitute by the name of Sitara. Both fall in love and Sitara becomes pregnant after they get intimate. When Gayetri finds out about their affair, she is enraged and will do anything in her power to prevent Sitara continuing to dominate Inderjeet's love. Before she could take any steps, Inderjeet dies in a plane accident, leaving Sitara alone and pregnant. Gayetri conspires against Sitara, invites her over, makes sure she gives birth, then tells her that the child was still-born. A devastated Sitara leaves to continue with her life, leaving Gayetri to bring up her son, Sunny, as her own. Years later, Sunny has grown up, has met with an attractive young woman named Amrita, who he would like to marry. When Gayetri finds out, she is initially happy, but relents when she finds out that Amrita is a dancer and singer on TV, and decides to oppose this marriage at all costs. But when Sunny adamantly refuses to marry anyone else, she permits Amrita's parents to meet with them. It is this meeting that will change everything in Gayatri and Sunny's lives forever, since Amrita is Sitara's niece.

Surprisingly the plot of this film is similar to another film Zameen Aasman starring Sanjay Dutt released in the same year. Both the movies had R. D. Burman as music composer.

Soundtrack

External links 
 

1984 films
1980s Hindi-language films
Films directed by Raj Khosla
Films scored by R. D. Burman
Indian pregnancy films